Centronics can mean:
 Centronics, a printer company that developed the  parallel port standard
 IEEE 1284, the parallel interface standard that superseded the Centronics interface
 Micro ribbon connectors, used by Centronics for their parallel port and often known as Centronics connectors